Malcolm Thompson  (born September 12, 1995) is a professional Canadian football defensive back for the Winnipeg Blue Bombers of the Canadian Football League (CFL).

University career 
Thompson played U Sports football for the Wilfrid Laurier Golden Hawks from 2014 to 2019. Before his university career began, Thompson tore his ACL while playing in the summer of 2014 with the Essex Ravens. After sitting out the 2014 season, he returned to play in 2015 for the Golden Hawks where he was named a Second Team OUA All-Star. In his second season, in 2016, he was named a U Sports First Team All-Canadian, but his season was cut short when he suffered another torn ACL in a game against the Guelph Gryphons on October 15, 2016.

After sitting out the 2017 season, Thompson returned in 2018, but had gained weight and found it difficult to play with a knee brace. Following a lacklustre season, he was not selected in the 2019 CFL Draft and returned to play for the Golden Hawks. In 2019, he returned to form as he played without a knee brace and was named a Second-Team OUA All-Star. He played in 31 games with the Golden Hawks where he had 120.5 tackles, nine interceptions, two sacks, eight pass knockdowns, one forced fumble, and two fumble recoveries.

Professional career

Calgary Stampeders 
On November 27, 2019, Thompson signed with the Calgary Stampeders as an undrafted free agent. However, he did not play in 2020 due to the cancellation of the 2020 CFL season. He attended training camp with the Stampeders in 2021, but was released on July 29, 2021.

Hamilton Tiger-Cats 
On November 1, 2021, it was announced that Thompson had signed with the Hamilton Tiger-Cats. Soon after, he played in his first career professional game on November 5, 2021, against the BC Lions, where he recorded one special teams tackle. He played in two regular season games for the team and did not play in the post-season where the Tiger-Cats lost the 108th Grey Cup to the Winnipeg Blue Bombers. Since he finished the season on the practice roster, he became a free agent on the day following the Grey Cup, on December 13, 2021.

Winnipeg Blue Bombers 
Thompson signed with the Winnipeg Blue Bombers for the 2022 season as it was announced on January 5, 2022. Due to an injury to the team's starting safety, Brandon Alexander, Thompson earned his first career start in the team's opening game of 2022 against the Ottawa Redblacks, where he recorded two defensive tackles and one special teams tackle in the Blue Bombers' victory. He played in the team's first seven games as the starting safety before suffering an injury and being placed on the injured list.

References

External links 
Winnipeg Blue Bombers bio 

1995 births
Living people
Calgary Stampeders players
Canadian football defensive backs
Hamilton Tiger-Cats players
Players of Canadian football from Ontario
Sportspeople from Windsor, Ontario
Wilfrid Laurier Golden Hawks football players
Winnipeg Blue Bombers players